Omar Al-Sabahi (born 24 June 1977) is an Egyptian rower. He competed in the men's lightweight double sculls event at the 2012 Summer Olympics.

References

1977 births
Living people
Egyptian male rowers
Olympic rowers of Egypt
Rowers at the 2012 Summer Olympics
Sportspeople from Giza